Tomás Carbonell and Francisco Roig were the defending champions, but Carbonell did not compete this year. Roig teamed up with Diego Pérez and lost in the semifinals to Horacio de la Peña and Vojtěch Flégl.

Sergio Casal and Emilio Sánchez won the title by defeating De la Peña and Flégl 6–1, 6–2 in the final.

Seeds
All seeds received a bye to the second round.

Draw

Finals

Top half

Bottom half

References

External links
 Official results archive (ITF)

Doubles
Austrian Open Kitzbühel